The 1956 Gent–Wevelgem was the 18th edition of the Gent–Wevelgem cycle race and was held on 25 March 1956. The race started in Ghent and finished in Wevelgem. The race was won by Rik Van Looy.

General classification

References

Gent–Wevelgem
1956 in road cycling
1956 in Belgian sport
March 1956 sports events in Europe